Sonia Blangiardo (born April 18, 1968 in Brooklyn, New York, USA) is an American television soap opera director and producer. She is also the creator and director of the web series Tainted Dreams, which debuted on YouTube in December 2013.

Positions held
All My Children
 Associate Producer (Late 1990s - 2000)
 Supervising Producer (April 2013 – August 2013)

One Life to Live
 Coordinating Producer (2000 - 2002)
 Producer (2010 - 2012)

As the World Turns
 Director (July 15, 2004 - September 17, 2010)
"Days of Our Lives"
Director (2015–present)

Tainted Dreams (web series)
 Creator, director, writer, actor (2013)

Winterthorne (web series)
 Director (2015)

Pride: The Series (web series)

 Consulting Producer (2016)

Awards and nominations
Daytime Emmy Award
 Win, 2017, Directing, "Days Of Our Lives"
 Win, 2007, Directing, As the World Turns
 Win, 2002, Drama Series, One Life to Live
 Nomination, 2014, Daytime Emmy Award for Outstanding New Approaches Drama Series, Tainted Dreams
 Nomination, 2017, Daytime Emmy Award for Outstanding Digital Daytime Drama Series, Tainted Dreams

Indie Series Award
 Nomination, 2016, Best Directing — Drama, Winterthorne

References

External links
 

1968 births
American television directors
Television producers from New York City
American women television producers
American women television directors
Soap opera producers
Living people
People from Brooklyn
Valley Stream Central High School alumni
21st-century American women